Tillman R. Sease Sr. (September 6, 1916 – September 2, 1988) was an American football and baseball coach. He served as the head football coach at Bluefield State College in Bluefield, West Virginia from 1959 to 1961 and Howard University in Washington, D.C. from 1962 to 1968 and from 1970 to 1972, compiling a career college football coaching record of 53–58–1. He was also Howard's head baseball coach.

A native of York, Pennsylvania, Sease graduated from Bluefield State in 1948 and later earned a master's degree in education from Columbia University. From 1948 to 1956, he was the athletic director at Christiansburg Institute in Christiansburg, Virginia, where he also coached football, basketball, and baseball. Sease returned to Bluefield State in 1956, where he worked as an assistant football and basketball coach under Sam B. Taylor for three years. He was appointed athletic director at Bluefield State in 1959.

Head coaching record

College football

References

1916 births
1988 deaths
Bluefield State Big Blues athletic directors
Bluefield State Big Blues football coaches
Bluefield State Big Blues men's basketball coaches
Howard Bison baseball coaches
Howard Bison football coaches
Bluefield State College alumni
Columbia University alumni
Sportspeople from York, Pennsylvania
African-American coaches of American football
African-American college athletic directors in the United States
20th-century African-American sportspeople